KBLL is a radio station licensed to serve Helena, Montana. Owned by Kevin Terry, through licensee The Montana Radio Company, LLC, it broadcasts a country music format branded as 99.5 The Bull.

Ownership
In April 2004, a deal was reached for KBLL-FM to be acquired by Cherry Creek Radio from Holter Broadcasting Corp. (Jann Holter-Lambert, president) as part of a 2 station deal with a total reported sale price of $2.8 million.

On April 5, 2017, Montana Radio Company announced that it would acquire Cherry Creek Media's Helena stations. Following the completion of the purchase on July 28, 2017, KBLL-FM re-aligned its format to include more classic country material to differentiate it from new sister station KIMO.

References

External links
99.5 The Bull Facebook

BLL
Radio stations established in 1979
1979 establishments in Montana
Country radio stations in the United States